Soonjung Manhwa (lit. "Pure/Romantic Comic" or the Korean version of shōjo manga; internationally, also known as Love Story and Crush On You, is a South Korean webtoon written by Kang Full. It became a hit, which built up an enthusiastic audience and drew in more than 60 million page views on the web portal Daum. The story revolves around two unconventional romances with a noticeable age disparity. It was adapted into the live action movie Hello, Schoolgirl.

Characters

 Kim Yeon-woo (김연우)
A shy, 30-year-old civil servant who moves into an apartment next door to Soo-young. Yeon-woo lost his parents at a young age and was raised by his grandparents and relatives. Having been on a string of unsuccessful blind dates with various women, he befriends Soo-young after she throws garbage on him near a dustbin while she is on her way to school. Their relationship grows closer, but Yeon-woo struggles with his feelings for Soo-young. In the end he and Soo-young both confess their love for each other.

 Han Soo-young (한수영)
An 18-year-old high school student named Soo-young lives with her doting mother, who has raised her alone since Soo-young's father left them when she was young. Despite the challenges she's faced, Soo-young is known for her bright, fiery personality. When she and her best friend Da-jung run into Yeon-woo on the train, she asks him to give her his tie, and it cements their friendship. In college, she almost dates Kang Sook, but she can't get over Yeon-woo.

 Kang Sook (강숙)
A 22-year-old high school graduate, and Yeon-woo's colleague. He falls for Ha-kyung after they meet at a park. They begin dating after a while, and she's shocked when Sook kisses her. But he doesn't know about her scars from the past. He goes off to fulfill his mandatory military service and returns a changed man.

 Kwon Ha-kyung  (권하경)
A 29-year-old melancholy photographer. She is still in mourning over her boyfriend's death. At first, she doesn't return Sook's feelings, but she soon sees him in a new light.

 Jeong Da-jung (정다정)
Soo-young's best friend who thinks Kang Sook is Soo-young's boyfriend.

 Kyu-chul  (규철)
Ha-kyung's boyfriend who was a photographer and died as a soldier.

 Mrs. Han
Soo-young's mother, an eccentric woman who raised her daughter singlehandedly after her husband left them some years ago. She is shocked when she sees Soo-young and Yeon-woo holding hands. She is also troubled that Yeon-woo is an orphan.

 Kyu-chul's parents
An elderly couple who works at a laundromat. They lost their only son two years ago, and his girlfriend Ha-kyung has visited them many times since. Yeon-woo is a frequent customer, and Kyu-chul's mother gives him Kyu-chul's clothes, but her husband doesn't want Yeon-woo to replace his late son.

Film adaptation

In November 2008, Love Story was adapted into a feature-length film titled Hello, Schoolgirl. Directed by Ryu Jang-ha, the film deviates a lot from its source material, but keeps the webtoon's main themes intact. The film was a financial success on release, topping the box office on its first weekend.

References

External links
 Soonjung Manhwa webtoon at Daum

Manhwa titles
South Korean webtoons
Romance comics
Comics by Kang Full
Manhwa adapted into films
Romance webtoons